Felix Otto (born 19 May 1966) is a German mathematician.

Biography

He studied mathematics at the University of Bonn, finishing his PhD thesis in 1993 under the supervision of Stephan Luckhaus.
After postdoctoral studies at the Courant Institute of Mathematical Sciences of New York University and at Carnegie Mellon University, in 1997 he became a professor at the University of California, Santa Barbara. From 1999 to 2010 he was professor for applied mathematics at the University of Bonn, and currently serves as one of the directors of the Max Planck Institute for Mathematics in the Sciences, Leipzig.

Honours

In 2006, he received the Gottfried Wilhelm Leibniz Prize of the Deutsche Forschungsgemeinschaft, 
which is the highest honour awarded in German research. In 2009, he was awarded a Gauss Lecture by the German Mathematical Society. In 2008 he became a member of the German Academy of Sciences Leopoldina.

References

 DFG portrait

1966 births
Living people
20th-century German mathematicians
University of Bonn alumni
Courant Institute of Mathematical Sciences alumni
Carnegie Mellon University alumni
Academic staff of the University of Bonn
University of California, Santa Barbara faculty
Studienstiftung alumni
Gottfried Wilhelm Leibniz Prize winners
21st-century German mathematicians
Members of the German Academy of Sciences Leopoldina
Max Planck Institute directors